"Spiny Tree Frog" is also used for Litoria spinifera from New Guinea.

The spiny tree frog (Nyctixalus spinosum) is a species of frog in the family Rhacophoridae. It is endemic to the Philippines and occurs on Mindanao, Leyte, Bohol, and Basilan, possibly wider.

Description
The body is elongated, tapering from the temporal region. There are prominent spinose tubercles on all dorsal surfaces, especially on the eyelids. The tympanum is distinct. The colouration is brown about with some yellow spots, and yellow or orange below. Fingers are unwebbed but toes have some webbing. Males have nuptial pads but appear to lack vocal sacks.

Habitat and conservation
Its natural habitats are montane and lowland rainforests. It is a forest floor species that lays its eggs in tree holes. It is threatened by habitat loss caused by agriculture and human settlement.

References

Nyctixalus
Amphibians of the Philippines
Endemic fauna of the Philippines
Taxonomy articles created by Polbot
Amphibians described in 1920